The 127th Command and Control Squadron (127 CACS) was a unit of the Kansas Air National Guard 184th Intelligence Wing stationed at McConnell Air Force Base, Wichita, Kansas.  The 127th was a non-flying squadron operating the Distributed Common Ground System.  The unit was inactivated on 29 September 2014.

The squadron is a descendant organization of the Kansas National Guard 127th Observation Squadron, established on 30 July 1940.  It is one of the 29 original National Guard Observation Squadrons of the United States Army National Guard formed before World War II.

Overview
The mission of the 127 CACS was to provide communication support to the U.S. Government at all levels, including United States Department of Defense, Department of Homeland Security, Federal Emergency Management Agency, state, and local agencies. These agencies are provided redundant communities during Peace Time, Natural Disasters and National Emergencies. Equipment utilized in support of the mission is flexible and state of the art, enabling the 127th to provide services in a full spectrum of situations.

History
Established by the National Guard Bureau on 30 July 1940 as the 127th Observation Squadron, and activated in August 1941.  Initially the squadron had 115 men in its ranks. It was, however, still short of officers since it only had nine officers but was authorized a total of thirty-one.  Moved to Sherman Field at Fort Leavenworth, by November 1941 the squadron had one BE-1, one O-47A, one O-38E and several L-1's. All of the aircraft were single engine observation/liaison planes.

World War II
The 127th was ordered to federal service on 6 October 1941, became a training unit for observation and liaison pilots.  According to the original plans, the squadron was to be based at Brownwood Army Airfield, Texas until the "emergency" was over and it could return to its home base at Wichita. The 7 December 1941 Japanese attack on Pearl Harbor changed all plans for American military units. A number of 127th personnel were off the base that Sunday (7 December) and returned to find it almost impossible to get back on base.  Was moved to Tullahoma Army Air Base, Tullahoma, Tennessee.

Tullahoma Army Air Base was situated in close proximity to Camp Forrest, Tennessee, the site of a major infantry center.  Trained on missions cooperating with the 33d and 80th Infantry divisions, both of which were stationed in the vicinity. At the same time the 124th Observation Squadron from the Iowa National Guard was stationed at Tullahoma. Beginning in 1942, the squadron was assigned to the 75th Observation Group (headquartered in Birmingham, Alabama) for its higher headquarters. The squadron left Tullahoma on 5 September 1942, for Barksdale Army Airfield, Shreveport, Louisiana to participate in the largest war games ever staged by the United States Army. During the Louisiana Maneuvers the 127th worked in close cooperation with their higher headquarters, the 75th Observation Group.

On 19 August 1943, the 127th was reassigned to the First Air Support Command (headquarters at Morris Field, Charlotte, North Carolina). This command would soon become the First Tactical Air Division.  Beginning in April 1944 the squadron received indications that it would not remain a training organization much longer.  on 10 November 1944, three years after mobilization, the squadron left the United States for the Pacific Theater. Docked at Bombay, India on 10 December 1944 being assigned to the Tenth Air Force in the China Burma India Theater.

Squadron pilots were constantly involved in duties supporting the British Army. Their missions included such activities as photographic and reconnaissance duties, evacuation of wounded, supply drops, courier duties, and cargo flights. They were entrusted with secret messages, regular mail and with transporting fresh blood to the front. Their operations were directed from the Tactical Air Command headquarters of the Fifteenth Corps of the British Army (their actual higher headquarters in this period was the Second Air Commando Group, United States Army Air Corps).  The 127th Liaison Squadron (Commando) cooperated with the British Army from the beginning of the Burma offensive in February until the latter part of April 1945. Through this campaign, every pilot that participated (with one exception) flew sufficient hours and missions to entitle him to an Air Medal with one Oak Leaf Cluster, the Distinguished Flying Cross, and most of the pilots were eligible for a second Oak Leaf Cluster to the Air Medal.

After the end of the war, was moved to Okinawa where the unit was inactivated.

Kansas Air National Guard

The wartime 127th Liaison Squadron was re-designated as the 127th Fighter Squadron and was allotted to the Kansas Air National Guard, on 24 May 1946. It was organized at Wichita Army Airfield, and was extended federal recognition on 7 September 1946 by the National Guard Bureau.  The 127th Fighter Squadron was bestowed the history, honors, and colors of the 127th Liaison Squadron. The squadron was equipped with F-51D Mustangs and was assigned to the Missouri ANG 131st Fighter Group for administration, however it was placed under the Kansas Military Department for operational control.  The F-51 was flown until December 1949, when the unit received the F-84C Thunderjet fighter.

Korean War activation
The 127th was federalized on 10 October 1950 due to the Korean War.  It was assigned to the federalized Oklahoma ANG 137th Fighter-Bomber Wing and equipped with F-84G Thunderjets.  Along with the Oklahoma ANG 125th Fighter Squadron and Georgia ANG 128th Fighter Squadron, the wing was scheduled for deployment to the new Chaumont-Semoutiers AB, France, as part of the United States Air Forces in Europe (USAFE).

by 27 November, the wing assembled at Alexandria Municipal Airport, Louisiana for conversion training in the newer F-84Gs. Deployment of the wing was delayed, however, by the need to transfer pilots to Korea from training and delays in receiving engines for the F-84Gs, as well as the ongoing construction at Chaumont AB. Training and delays continued throughout 1951. Due to these delays, many of the activated National Guard airmen were released from active duty and never deployed to France.

With mostly regular Air Force personnel and all the delays behind them, the remaining Guardsmen departed Louisiana on 5 May 1952 for Europe, however, the 128th inherited a base that was little more than acres of mud where wheat fields used to be. The only hardened facilities at Chaumont was a concrete runway and a handful of tarpaper shacks. The 127th wound up being stationed by USAFE at Neubiberg Air Base, West Germany until the facilities in France were suitable for military use. The aircraft arrived at Chaumont on 25 June, being the first USAF tactical air fighters to be based permanently in France, albeit working mostly in tents and temporary wooden buildings on their new base.

The Guardsmen of the 127th ended their active-duty tour in France and returned to the United States in late June, leaving their F-84 Thunderjets in Europe.

Cold War

Upon the squadrons return to Wichita, the 127th Fighter-Bomber squadron was again assigned F-51D aircraft due to the shortage of jets created by the Korean War. In June 1954, F-80C Shooting Star jet fighters were assigned, followed by designation of the unit to the 127th Fighter Interceptor Squadron, and assignment of the F-86L Sabre all-weather interceptor in January 1958 being used in an air defense mission for Air Defense Command.

The unit converted to the F-100C Super Sabre, and was designated the 127th Tactical Fighter Squadron in April 1961, being assigned to Tactical Air Command.  On 1 October 1962, the 127th was authorized to expand to a group level, and the 184th Tactical Fighter Group was established by the National Guard Bureau. The 127th TFS becoming the group's flying squadron. Other squadrons assigned into the group were the 184th Headquarters, 184th Material Squadron (Maintenance), 184th Combat Support Squadron, and the 184th USAF Dispensary.

The unit was assigned as part of the 354th Tactical Fighter Wing until release from active duty and return to state control in June 1969. On 25 March 1971, the 184th was designated the 184th Tactical Fighter Training Group and acquired the F-105 Thunderchief aircraft, receiving Vietnam War returning aircraft. As the USAF Combat Crew Training School, the unit conducted pilot training in the F-105 for nine years.

On 1 October 1973, the 184th assumed the responsibility of operating and maintaining the Smoky Hill Weapons Range at Salina, Kansas. With over 36,000 acres, Smoky Hill is the Air National Guard's largest weapons range.

On 7 August 1979, the unit received its first F-4D Phantom II, and on 8 October 1979, was designated as the 184th Tactical Fighter Group, equipped with 50 F-4D's. In April 1982, the 184th was tasked to develop a F-4D Fighter Weapons Instructor Course to meet the needs of the Air Reserve Forces and the USAF Tactical Air Command.

In January 1987, the 184th was tasked to activate a squadron of F-16A/B Fighting Falcon aircraft, and conduct conversion and upgrade training in the F-16. On 8 July 1987, the 161st Tactical Fighter Training Squadron was established as the third flying squadron at the 184th TFG. Formal activation ceremonies for the 161st occurred on 12 September 1987, with the unit flying 10 F-16s and conducting its first student training class.  In August 1988, the 127th Tactical Fighter Squadron graduated its final Fighter Weapons Instructor Course Class. The 127th TFS converted as the second F-16 training squadron. The last F-4D departed from the 184th TFG on 31 March 1990. The 161st TFTS began converting to the F-16 C/D when the first C/D model arrived at the 184th TFG in July 1990.

Post Cold War era
In July 1993, the 184th Fighter Group changed gaining commands and became part of the new Air Education and Training Command. In July 1994, the 184th Fighter Group was designated at the 184th Bomb Wing and again became part of the Air Combat Command, flying the B-1B Lancer. The 184th was the first Air National Guard unit to fly bombers.  It received its B-1Bs from the former 28th Bomb Squadron/384th Bomb Wing at McConnell.

In order to save money, the USAF agreed to reduce its active fleet of B-1Bs from 92 to 60 aircraft. The first B-1B was flown to storage at AMARC on 20 August 2002. In total, 24 B-1Bs were consigned to storage at AMARC, with ten of these being retained in "active storage" which means that they could be quickly returned to service should circumstances dictate. The remaining 14 in storage at AMARC will be scavenged for spare parts to keep the remainder flying. The remaining 8 aircraft to be withdrawn from service were placed on static display at various museums.  In exchange for retiring its B-1s, the 184th was redesigned the 184th Air Refueling Wing on 16 September 2002, flying the KC-135R tanker. In addition to the tanker mission, the 184th also took on several new missions within the information operations mission set.

BRAC 2005
In its 2005 BRAC Recommendations, DoD recommended to realign McConnell Air National Guard (ANG) Base by relocating the 184th Air Refueling Wing (ANG) nine KC-135R aircraft to the 190th Air Refueling Wing at Forbes Field AGS, which would retire its eight assigned KC-135E aircraft. The 184th Air Refueling Wing 's operations and maintenance manpower would transfer with the aircraft to Forbes. Realigning ANG KC-135R aircraft from McConnell to Forbes would replace the 190th's aging, higher maintenance KC-135E aircraft with newer models while retaining the experienced personnel from one of the highest-ranking reserve component tanker bases.

In June 2007, the 190 ARW gained custody of all KC-135R aircraft from the 184th ARW. This action consolidated all of the Kansas ANG's KC-135R assets into a single wing located at Forbes Field. In April 2008, the 184th Air Refueling Wing was designated the 184th Intelligence Wing making it the first Intelligence Wing in the Air National Guard. With the loss of the flying mission the "Flying Jayhawks" are now the "Fighting Jayhawks".

Lineage

 Designated as the 127th Observation Squadron and allotted to the National Guard on 30 July 1940
 Activated on 4 August 1941
 Ordered to active service on 6 October 1941
 Redesignated 127th Observation Squadron (Light) on 13 January 1942
 Redesignated 127th Observation Squadron on 4 July 1942
 Redesignated 127th Liaison Squadron on 2 April 1943
 Redesignated 127th Liaison Squadron (Commando) on 1 May 1944
 Inactivated on 15 November 1945
 Redesignated 127th Fighter Squadron and allotted to the National Guard on 24 May 1946
 Actuvated on 27 August 1946
 Extended federal recognition on 7 September 1946
 Ordered to active service on 10 October 1950
 Relieved from active duty and returned to state control on 10 July 1952
 Redesignated 127th Fighter-Bomber Squadron on 10 July 1952
 Redesignated 127th Fighter-Interceptor Squadron on 1 June 1954
 Redesignated 127th Tactical Fighter Squadron (Special Delivery) on 1 April 1961
 Redesignated 127th Tactical Fighter Squadron c. 15 October 1962
 Ordered to active service on 26 January 1968
 Relieved from active duty and returned to state control on 18 June 1969
 Redesignated 127th Tactical Fighter Training Squadron on 25 March 1971
 Redesignated 127th Tactical Fighter Squadron on 8 October 1979
 Redesignated 127th Fighter Squadron on 16 March 1992
 Redesignated 127th Bomb Squadron on 1 July 1994
 Redesignated 127th Air Refueling Squadron on 16 September 2002
 Redesignated 127th Command and Control Squadron on 1 April 2008
 Inactivated in September 2014

Assignments
 Kansas National Guard, 4 August 1941
 68th Observation Group, 6 October 1941
 75th Observation Group (later 75th Reconnaissance Group), 12 March 1942
 I Air Support Command (later I Tactical Air Division; III Tactical Air Division), 11 August 1943
 2d Air Commando Group, 1 May 1944
 United States Army Forces, Pacific, 4 August 1945
 Thirteenth Air Force, 15 September 1945
 Seventh Air Force, 29 October – 15 November 1945
 131st Fighter Group, 7 September 1946
 137th Fighter-Bomber Group, 10 October 1950
 131st Fighter-Bomber Group (later 131st Fighter-Interceptor Group, 131st Fighter Group (Air Defense), 131st Tactical Fighter Group), 10 July 1952
 184th Tactical Fighter Group, 1 October 1962
 354th Tactical Fighter Wing, 26 January 1968
 184th Tactical Fighter Group (later 184th Tactical Fighter Training Group, 184th Tactical Fighter Group, 184th Fighter Group, 184th Bomb Group), 18 June 1969
 184th Operations Group, 1 October 1995
 184th Regional Support Group, 1 July 2007 – 29 September 2014

Stations

 Wichita Municipal Airport, Kansas, 4 August 1941;
 Sherman Army Airfield, Kansas, 13 October 1941
 William Northern Field, Tennessee, 13 April 1942
 Morris Field, North Carolina, 2 September 1943
 Statesboro Army Air Field, Georgia, 13 October 1943
 Aiken Army Air Field, South Carolina, 18 May 1944
 Dunnellon Army Air Field, Florida, 10 June 1944
 Cross City Army Air Field, Florida, 21 June 1944
 Drew Field, Florida, 17 August 1944
 Lakeland Army Air Field, Florida, 22 Aug-23 Oct 1944
 Kalaikunda Airfield, India, 16 December 1944 – 4 August 1945
 "B" Flight operated from: Cox's Bazar Airfield, Burma, 20 Jan-c. 7 February 1945
 "B" Flight operated from: Akyab Airfield, Burma, 21 Feb-19 May 1945

 Yontan Airfield, Okinawa, 15 Sep-15 Nov 1945
 Wichita Army Air Field, 7 September 1946
 Wichita Municipal Airport, 15 November 1946
 Alexandria Air Force Base, Louisiana, 27 November 1950 – 4 May 1952
 Chaumont-Semoutiers AB, France, 13 May 1952 – 10 July 1952
 Wichita Air Force Base (later McConnell Air Force Base), 10 July 1952
 Kunsan Air Base, South Korea, 26 January 1968 – 18 June 1969
 McConnell Air Force Base, 18 June 1969 – 29 September 2014

Aircraft

 North American O-47, 1943–1944
 Included Douglas O-38, Douglas O-46, and O-49A Vigilant, 1941–1942
 A-20 Havoc, 1942–1943
 P-40 Warhawk, 1942–1943
 L-6 Grasshopper, 1942–1943
 L-5 Sentinel, 1944–1945
 C-64 Norseman, 1944–1945
 L-4 Grasshopper, 1945
 L-1 Vigilant, 1945
 F-51D Mustang, 1946–1949; 1952–1954
 F-84C Thunderjet, 1949–1950

 F-84G Thunderjet, 1950–1952
 F-80C Shooting Star, 1954–1958
 F-86D Sabre Interceptor, 1958–1961
 F-100C Super Sabre, 1961–1971
 F-105 Thunderchief, 1971–1979
 F-4D Phantom II, 1979–1987
 F-16A/B Fighting Falcon, 1987–1990
 F-16C/D Fighting Falcon, 1990–1994
 B-1B Lancer, 1994–2002
 KC-135R Stratotanker, 2002–2007

See also

 List of observation squadrons of the United States Army National Guard

References

Notes

Bibliography

 

Squadrons of the United States Air National Guard
Command and control squadrons of the United States Air Force
Military units and formations in Kansas